Rutgers School of Public Affairs and Administration (SPAA) is the public administration school of Rutgers University, and is located on the Rutgers-Newark campus.

Rutgers SPAA offers bachelor's, Master of Public Administration (MPA), and Ph.D. degrees as well as graduate and non-credit certificates focused on particular issues of public and nonprofit management and policy implementation. The State of New Jersey's Certified Public Manager program is housed at SPAA.

History
The School of Public Affairs and Administration (SPAA) was founded in 2006 after providing doctoral and master's public administration education for over 30 years to pre-service, in-service, and executive students through the Rutgers–Newark Graduate School.

Rankings and Accreditation
Rutgers School of Public Affairs and Administration has one of the top programs in public affairs and administration in the United States according to rankings released by U.S. News & World Report.

The school is accredited by the Network of Schools of Public Policy, Affairs, and Administration.

Notable Current and Former SPAA Faculty
Ariane Chebel d'Appollonia
James Davy
Marc Holzer
Norma Riccucci

References

External links
 

Public administration schools in the United States
Rutgers School of Public
Universities and colleges in Essex County, New Jersey
Education in Newark, New Jersey